Eremophila oldfieldii, commonly known as pixie bush, is a flowering plant in the figwort family, Scrophulariaceae and is endemic to Western Australia. It is a shrub or small tree with rough bark, broad, flat or narrow fleshy leaves and red, orange or yellow flowers.

Description

The petal tube is  red to orange-yellow and glabrous on the outside surface. The edges and inside surface of the petal lobes are covered with glandular hairs. The 4 stamens extend beyond the end of the petal tube.

Taxonomy and naming
The first formal description of this species was published in 1859 by botanist Ferdinand von Mueller in Fragmenta phytographiae Australiae. The specific epithet (oldfieldii) honours Augustus Frederick Oldfield who made the type collection.

Subspecies
Two subspecies have been described:
 Eremophila oldfieldii  F.Muell.  subsp. oldfieldii which has thin, flat leaves;
 Eremophila oldfieldii subsp. angustifolia (S.Moore) Chinnock which has thick, narrow, fleshy leaves.

A third, distinctive, rare subspecies, known as Eremophila oldfieldii subsp. Karara was discovered in 2010 but is yet to be formally described. It only grows near Rothsay in the Yalgoo biogeographic region and is classified as "Priority One" by the Government of Western Australia Department of Parks and Wildlife, meaning that it is known from only one or a few locations which are potentially at risk.

Distribution and habitat
Subspecies oldfieldii is a common widespread eremophila which grows in clay, loam or calcareous sand between Wongan Hills and Shark Bay in the Avon Wheatbelt, Carnarvon, Coolgardie, Geraldton Sandplains, Murchison and Yalgoo biogeographic regions. Subspecies angustifolia grows in rocky places between Kalgoorlie and Cue in the Avon Wheatbelt, Coolgardie, Geraldton Sandplains, Great Victoria Desert, Murchison and Yalgoo biogeographic regions.

Conservation
The two formally described subspecies of E. oldfieldii have been classified as "not threatened" by the Government of Western Australia Department of Parks and Wildlife.

Use in horticulture
The bright red flowers of this large shrub stand out from its dark green leaves. It is a hardy plant which has been grown in eastern Australia and can be used as a windbreak or screening plant. It can be propagated from cuttings and grown in a wide range of soils in either full sun or partial shade. It is very drought tolerant but may be damaged by severe frosts.

References

oldfieldii
Eudicots of Western Australia
Endemic flora of Western Australia
Plants described in 1859
Taxa named by Ferdinand von Mueller